Rohan is an urban-type settlement located in Kharkiv Raion, Kharkiv Oblast (province) of eastern Ukraine near the oblast's capital of Kharkiv. Rohanska hosts the administration of Rohan settlement hromada, one of the hromadas of Ukraine. Population:

History 
It was founded in 1736.

In January 1989 the population was 5305 people.

In January 2013 the population was 5045 people.

A railway station is near the settlement.

References

Urban-type settlements in Kharkiv Raion
Populated places established in 1736